Herbert Edward Stacy Abbott  (6 April 1855 – 13 June 1939) was a British Army officer and an English amateur cricketer who made one appearance in first-class cricket.

The son of Major-General Herbert Edward Stacy Abbott, he was born in British India at Alipore. He was educated at Elizabeth College, Guernsey, before attending the Royal Military Academy, Woolwich.  Abbott was commissioned into the Royal Engineers on 17 August 1874, and was sent to India in 1877. He served in the Second Anglo-Afghan War as an assistant engineer. Following the war he was posted to the Punjab where he worked in the Punjab Public Works Department. He was promoted to captain in August 1885 and later served with the Hazara Expedition of 1888, with promotion to major coming in 1894. He was awarded the Distinguished Service Order in January 1896 for his actions with the Chitral Relief Force, and was later promoted to lieutenant colonel in 1901.

While briefly back in England in 1902, Abbott played a single first-class cricket match, at the age of 47, for Marylebone Cricket Club (MCC) against London County at Crystal Palace. He returned to India where he became the officiating Chief Engineer of the Public Works Department in the Punjab, 1903–1904, before returning to England to retire in 1906, upon which he was granted the rank of colonel. He was re-employed in 1909 as War Office Inspector of Territorial Buildings and was placed in charge of the Duke of York's Headquarters in Chelsea. His only son was killed in action during the First World War, during which Abbott served in London on special duties. He was made a CBE in the War Honours List of January 1919.

He died at Richmond in Surrey on 13 June 1939.

References

External links 

1855 births
1939 deaths
Military personnel from Kolkata
People educated at Elizabeth College, Guernsey
Graduates of the Royal Military Academy, Woolwich
Royal Engineers officers
British military personnel of the Second Anglo-Afghan War
British military personnel of the Hazara Expedition of 1888
British military personnel of the Chitral Expedition
Companions of the Distinguished Service Order
English cricketers
Marylebone Cricket Club cricketers
Commanders of the Order of the British Empire
Military personnel of British India